Cornel Râpă (born 16 January 1990) is a Romanian professional footballer who plays as a right-back for Ekstraklasa club MKS Cracovia.

Club career
Râpă made his professional debut for his youth club Oțelul Galați, in 2008. He scored his first professional goal in March 2011, in a match against Universitatea Cluj. In 2013, Râpă left Oțelul Galați in order to join fellow Liga I club Steaua București.

International career
Râpă made his debut for the Romania national team at the age of 20 in 2010 in a friendly game against Italy played in Klagenfurt.

Club statistics 
As of 25 February 2023.

International

Honours

Club
Oțelul Galați
Liga I: 2010–11
Supercupa României: 2011

Steaua București
Liga I: 2012–13, 2013–14, 2014–15
Cupa României: 2014–15
Supercupa României: 2013
Cupa Ligii: 2014–15, 2015–16

Cracovia
Polish Cup: 2019–20
Polish Supercup: 2020

References

External links
 
 
 

1990 births
Living people
Sportspeople from Galați
Romanian footballers
Romania youth international footballers
Romania under-21 international footballers
Romania international footballers
Association football defenders
ASC Oțelul Galați players
FC Steaua București players
Liga I players
Ekstraklasa players
Pogoń Szczecin players
MKS Cracovia (football) players
Romanian expatriate footballers
Romanian expatriate sportspeople in Poland
Expatriate footballers in Poland